Zhongxiang is a county-level city of Jingmen, central Hubei province, People's Republic of China. The name Zhongxiang means "Blessed with propitious omen", and was given to the city by the Jiajing Emperor in the Ming dynasty.

History
Zhongxiang is one of the cradles of Chu culture. It was the alternate capital of the Chu state in the Spring and Autumn period and the Warring States period.

Because the Jiajing Emperor (r. 1521–1566) of the Ming dynasty was born and had lived in the city before he succeeded to the throne, Zhongxiang, the place where the Chengtian Prefecture (fu) Government Office was located, became one of the three major prefectures directly under the central government. Once on the throne, the Jiajing Emperor controversially had his dead father Zhu Youyuan (1476–1519) retroactively styled as the Gongruixian Emperor; his mother became the Zhangsheng empress dowager. They were buried at a sumptuous mausoleum, knowns as the Xianling Tomb, a few kilometers northeast of Zhongxiang.

During the Jiajing Emperor's reign, a large estate owned by the emperor occupied a significant part of Chengtian Prefecture, and was run by the same eunuch who was in charge of the protection of the mausoleum.

The mausoleum complex is now a tourist site; it was included on the List of UNESCO World Heritage Sites in 2000, as one of the Imperial Tombs of the Ming and Qing Dynasties.

Geography

After the building of the Three Gorges Dam a number of people from the Gaoyang area moved to the area around Zhongxiang. It borders Suizhou to the northeast, Jingshan County to the east, Tianmen to the south, the two districts (urban area) of Jingmen to the west, and Yicheng to the northwest.

Climate
Zhongxiang has a four-season humid subtropical climate (Köppen Cfa), with cold, damp (but comparatively dry), winters, and hot, humid summers. July is the hottest month, with an average temperature .

Zhongxiang has abundant precipitation throughout the year, with average precipitation of  every year. Rain and heat are occurring in the same season. Snow is infrequent. Zhongxiang receives plenty of sunshine, with about 1930.8 to 2114.3 hours every year.

Administrative divisions
Zhongxiang is administratively equal to a county and is divided into 17 township-level division: 1 subdistrict, 15 towns, and 1 township.
Yingzhong Subdistrict, 170,991
Yangzi, 68,341
Changshou, 27,535
Fengle, 68,700
Huji, 129,891
Shuanghe, 46,220
Linkuang, 47,092
Wenji, 44,405
Lengshui, 47,393
Shipai, 84,296
Jiukou, 103,514
Chaihu, 95,663
Changtan, 20,338
Dongqiao, 24,085
Kedian, 14,581
Zhangji, 22,805
Jiuli Township, 16,718

Economy

Industry
After years of construction, an industrial structure has been initially formed by the development of machinery, building materials, chemicals, light industry, textile and food industry. Among more than 600 industrial products, 20 of them entered international markets, 45 species are at national leading level and 130 species are at the leading level in Hubei province.

As of 2009, 265 main industrial enterprises contribute 19.563 billion yuan to the city's industrial output value with a sales value of 18.9747 billion yuan, export delivery value of 307.16 million yuan.

Agriculture
ZhongXiang has diversified terrain and appropriate subtropical monsoon climate. The total land area is 4760 square kilometer, with 1300 square kilometer cultivated land 300 square kilometer uncultivated land. Area for forest, waters and pasture is 1300 square kilometer, 50 square kilometer and 1200 square kilometer respectively. The total amount of freshwater resources is 5104.2 billion cubic meters.

With diversified terrain, there are different kinds of agricultural products. Main agricultural products include grains, cotton, oil, pigs, poultry, fruits, vegetables, and edible fungus. Main crops includes rice, wheat, corn, soybean silkworm peas, and cotton, rapeseed, peanut, sesame, vegetables, citrus fruit, pears, grape, red jujube, peaches, tea, etc.

In 2009, the municipal agricultural output value reached 8.2 billion yuan. Total agricultural production includes 816500 tons total grain output, 144100 tons cotton output, 120700 tons oil production; 92000 tons animal production; 110,000 tons output of aquatic products; 193,300 tons fruit production.

Sights
Xianling Tomb
Mountain Dahong National Scenic Area
Huangxian Cave famous for its karst landform
Wenxia Reservoir

References

Cities in Hubei
County-level divisions of Hubei
Jingmen